The Mexican National Welterweight Championship (Campeonato Nacional Peso Welter in Spanish) is a Mexican professional wrestling championship created and sanctioned by Comisión de Box y Lucha Libre Mexico D.F. (the Mexico City Boxing and Wrestling Commission). While the commission sanctions the title, it does not promote the events at which the title is defended. Consejo Mundial de Lucha Libre (CMLL) promotes the events and has the everyday control of the championship. Because Lucha Libre emphasizes the lower weight classes, this division is considered more important than the normally more prestigious heavyweight division of a promotion. As it is a professional wrestling championship, it is not won legitimately; it is instead won via a scripted ending to a match or awarded to a wrestler because of a storyline. All title matches take place under two out of three falls rules.

Karloff Lagarde holds all "longevity" records for the championship. He has had the longest individual reign (1,859 days), the longest combined reign (2,731 days) and the most reigns of any champion, with four. Psicosis holds the record for the shortest reign, having held the title for only two days. Soberano Jr. is the current champion, having defeated Rey Cometa on May 12, 2017, to win the championship. It is Soberano Jr.'s first Welterweight Championship reign and first championship reign of any kind, he is the 75th overall champion and the 56th person to hold the title.

History
The championship was created on June 17, 1934, making it  the oldest professional wrestling championship still promoted. Documentation is unclear on the details of the tournament other than that Mario Nuñez won the title by defeating Tony Canales in the final on June 17, 1934. In the early days of the championship no single professional wrestling promotion had exclusive control of the championship, but as Empresa Mexicana de Lucha Libre (EMLL; later renamed Consejo Mundial de Lucha Libre) became dominant it became the main promoter of the championship, with the Commission pre-approving the champions. After El Felino vacated the title in 1992, control of the championship was granted to Asistencia Asesoría y Administración (AAA), which promoted the title for the next six years. In 1998 control of the Welterweight Championship was returned to CMLL when Arkangel de la Muerte defeated El Toreo on a CMLL show. Since then the title has been promoted exclusively by CMLL.

1992 Championship tournament
On July 16, 1992, then-reigning Mexico National Welterweight Champion El Felino defeated América to win his first ever CMLL World Heavyweight Championship. After winning the title El Felino left the Mexico National title competition to focus on his CMLL World Welterweight Championship. CMLL held a 16-man tournament over two days, starting on August 9 with the finals of the tournament the following week on August 15. All matches took place at the Pista Arena Revolucion in Mexico City, Mexico

April 2013 Championship tournament
The Mexico National Welterweight Championship was vacated on March 20, 2013 when the then-champion Titán was unable to defend the championship due to a long term injury. CMLL announced that they would hold a tournament for the vacant championship starting on April 19, 2013. 10 wrestlers would compete in a Torneo cibernetico elimination match with the last two wrestlers meeting at a later date in a match to determine the next champion. CMLL announced that Místico La Nueva Era, Valiente, Rey Cometa, Guerrero Maya Jr., Fuego, Volador Jr., Averno, Tiger, Sangre Azteca and Namajague. Of the group Valiente and Sagre Azteca had held the Welterweight championship before. The tournament saw Averno and Místico La Nueva Era outlast everyone to earn the rights to wrestle for the title on April 26, 2013 as the main event of CMLL's Arena Mexico 57th Anniversary Show. In the finals Averno, with the help of his cornerman Mephisto was able to defeat La Nueva Era to win the championship for the first time.

Torneo Cibernetico order of elimination

Reigns

Combined reigns
Key

Footnotes

References

General source for title history before December 2004

Specific

Consejo Mundial de Lucha Libre championships
Mexican national wrestling championships
Welterweight wrestling championships
National professional wrestling championships